The Planets is a 2019 BBC/PBS television documentary series about the Solar System presented by Professor Brian Cox in the UK version and Zachary Quinto in the US version.

First broadcast on BBC Two beginning Tuesday 28 May 2019, the five-episode series looks at each planet in detail, examining scientific theories and hypotheses about the formation and evolution of the Solar System gained by unmanned missions to the planets. Originally released in the UK, it was changed to cater more to the American audience watching on PBS's series Nova.

Cox presents segments to camera from various locations around the world alongside extensive computer-generated imagery and footage from space missions. The series was created as a partnership between BBC Studios and the Open University.

Episodes

Merchandise
A 288-page hardback book written by Brian Cox and Andrew Cohen was released on 23 May 2019. by HarperCollins. The book was also released for ebook readers as well as an audiobook on the same day.

References

External links 
 

2019 British television series debuts
2019 British television series endings
2010s British documentary television series
Science education television series
BBC television documentaries
English-language television shows
Documentary films about outer space
Documentary television series about astronomy
BBC television documentaries about science
Nova (American TV program) episodes
Television series by BBC Studios